Hell's Crater is a 1918 American silent Western film directed by W.B. Pearson and starring Grace Cunard, George A. McDaniel and Eileen Sedgwick.

Cast
 Grace Cunard 
 George A. McDaniel 
 Ray Hanford 
 Eileen Sedgwick

References

External links
 

1918 films
1918 Western (genre) films
American black-and-white films
Silent American Western (genre) films
Universal Pictures films
1910s English-language films
1910s American films